is a Japanese synchronized swimmer.

References

1991 births
Living people
Japanese synchronized swimmers
Asian Games medalists in artistic swimming
Artistic swimmers at the 2010 Asian Games
Artistic swimmers at the 2014 Asian Games
World Aquatics Championships medalists in synchronised swimming
Synchronized swimmers at the 2015 World Aquatics Championships
Synchronized swimmers at the 2011 World Aquatics Championships
Synchronized swimmers at the 2013 World Aquatics Championships
Synchronized swimmers at the 2012 Summer Olympics
Synchronized swimmers at the 2016 Summer Olympics
Olympic synchronized swimmers of Japan
Olympic bronze medalists for Japan
Olympic medalists in synchronized swimming
Medalists at the 2016 Summer Olympics
Asian Games silver medalists for Japan
Medalists at the 2010 Asian Games
Medalists at the 2014 Asian Games
21st-century Japanese women